Dragan Cvetković (born 19 September 1961) is a Serbian footballer coach and a former professional player.

He coached Étoile du Sahel.

In June 2016 he became coach of Limoges FC.

He joined TP Mazembe in January 2019 as Technical Director.

References

External links
 

1961 births
Living people

Serbian footballers
Yugoslav footballers
Association football midfielders
Serbian expatriate footballers
Yugoslav expatriate footballers
Expatriate footballers in France
Yugoslav expatriates in France
Ligue 1 players
Ligue 2 players
Championnat National players
Championnat National 2 players
Championnat National 3 players
INF Vichy players
Racing Besançon players
SC Bastia players
RCP Fontainebleau players
Montluçon Football players
Bergerac Périgord FC players

Serbian football managers
SC Toulon managers
FC Spartak Vladikavkaz managers
Russian Premier League managers
Saudi First Division League managers
JSM Béjaïa managers
CS Hammam-Lif managers
Al-Wehda Club (Mecca) managers
US Monastir (football) managers
AS Marsa managers
JS Kairouan managers
Étoile Sportive du Sahel managers
Limoges FC managers
TP Mazembe managers
Expatriate football managers in France
Expatriate football managers in Russia
Serbian expatriate sportspeople in Russia
Expatriate football managers in Qatar
Serbian expatriate sportspeople in Qatar
Expatriate football managers in Algeria
Serbian expatriate sportspeople in Algeria
Expatriate football managers in Tunisia
Serbian expatriate sportspeople in Tunisia
Expatriate football managers in Saudi Arabia
Serbian expatriate sportspeople in Saudi Arabia
Expatriate football managers in the Democratic Republic of the Congo